Henry Gunter (1920-2007) was a leading British communist and civil rights leader, most famous for his campaigns for racial equality in the English city of Birmingham. After joining the Communist Party of Great Britain (CPGB), he authored a report titled A Man's a Man (1954), a key British anti-racist text published by the CPGB. He also authored numerous articles exposing racism in Birmingham's hotels, housing, and employment. Gunter also helped create the Birmingham branch of the Caribbean Labour Congress, and later served as the leader of the Afro Caribbean Society which he used to end racial segregation in the employment of Birmingham city's bus services. As an influential trade union leader, Gunter was the first black man to serve as a delegate for the Birmingham Trades Council, and forwarded a successful motion to the Trades Union Congress in support of the rights of immigrant workers. He dedicated his entire life to both trade union activism and fighting for the equal rights of black people.

Early life 
Henry Gunter was born in Portland, Jamaica, in 1920. Gunter studied in college to become an accountant before leaving for the Panama Canal Zone in 1940.

Travelling the world (1940-1950) 
The United States which controlled the Canal Zone were recruiting Jamaicans, convincing Gunter and many others to travel there for work in 1940. After arriving at the American controlled Canal, Gunter witnessed racial segregation for the first time in his life because the United States enforced Jim Crow laws in every territory they occupied. After briefly returning to Jamaica, he moved to a northern region of the United States known as Milwaukee, where he began working with local unions and started writing newspaper articles. His advocacy for the rights of African-Americans led to his writings being republished in Jamaica. During this time, Gunter met members of the Communist Party USA, who were supporters of equal rights for all races of people. Gunter continued working in the United States until the end of World War II, becoming more deeply entrenched in the trade union movement and the fight for the rights of black people. After Gunter briefly returned to Jamaica after WWII, an American regime security force called the Federal Bureau of Investigation (FBI) began to target Gunter for his anti-racist activism and refused to allow Gunter to return to the United States. It is thought that one of the reasons the FBI barred him from returning was due to his publication of a newspaper titled The Jamaican Worker.

Returning to Jamaica after WWII, Gunter joined the People's National Party and worked closely with one of their leaders, the communist icon Richard Hart. Job opportunities were extremely few after Gunter had been blocked from returning to the United States, so he chose to instead move to Britain, where he would then spend the remainder of his life, making his home in the English city of Birmingham sometime in 1949.

Life in Britain

Trade Union achievements 
After moving to Birmingham, Gunter immediately joined the Communist Party of Great Britain (CPGB), playing an important role in the party for many years. Despite being educated as an accountant he was sent to work in a brass rolling mill in Deritend, where he was soon fired after he challenged the racist views of a shop steward. After finding another job in Erdington as a tool cutter and machine operator, he became an active member of the Amalgamated Engineering Union. One of his greatest achievements in the trade union movement was becoming the first black delegate to the Birmingham Trades Council. He achieved further success within the trade union movement after forwarding a successful motion to the Trades Union Congress, one of the largest trade unions in the United Kingdom, in support of the rights of immigrant workers in Britain. The motion stated:"In view of the appalling conditions which immigrant workers have to live under in Birmingham, we ask that the TUC demand that the government provide accommodation for the workers”.While serving as an active CPGB communist party activist, Gunter also helped form the Birmingham branch of the Caribbean Labour Congress, an organisation dedicated to promoting workers rights and universal suffrage in the Caribbean. He often wrote articles for their newspaper Caribbean News.

Fight against Birmingham racial segregation 
During the 1950s racial segregation in Britain, often dubbed as the "colour bar", was particularly strong in Birmingham. The local branch of the CPGB communist party asked Henry Gunter to write about the situation within the city. Gunter wrote a work titled A Man's A Man: A Study of Colour Bar in Birmingham and an Answer (1954), which was published by the Communist Party of Great Britain. This work became a key British anti-racist text and had a national effect on how British people saw racial issues in the UK.

Henry Gunter joined the Afro Caribbean Society and soon became its leader, addressing public meetings on racism and organising marches under the banner "No Colour Bar to Housing and Jobs". Gunter led the Afro Caribbean Society to campaign for an end to racial discrimination in Birmingham city's bus transport system which was refusing to hire black people. Gunter and the Afro Caribbean Society's campaign led the city council to change this policy and allow black people to join the bus services as employees.

In 1958 Henry Gunter met American black civil rights legend Paul Robeson, who was very often a guest of British communist activists. Gunter also met Seretse Khama, who went onto become the president of Botswana. Other famous figures that Gunter became acquanted with include the famous black author and journalist George Padmore, and the politician Fenner Brockway.

In 2003 he Henry Gunter was commended by the Black History Foundation, who honoured him for "his outstanding service to the city of Birmingham."

Death and legacy 
Henry Gunter died on the 23 July 2007.

Methodist reverend Vicky Atkinson, a community leader which had lived in the same area as Gunter and knew him personally, said that Gunter "was a person who stuck by his principles and, as well as being an activist and very political, was also well read and articulate." She also went onto say that he "was a good man. He will be missed by a lot of people."

The Communist Party of Britain (CPB) the continuation of the original Communist Party of Great Britain (CPGB) which Gunter had been a member of, wrote Henry Gunter's short biography and described him as one of the party's "many unsung heroes".

Unite the Union included Henry Gunter in their 2014 Black History Month list of honoured British and Irish civil rights leaders.

Research papers connected to Henry Gunter are contained in the Wolfson Centre for Archival Research, held under the name "MS 2165".

See also 
 Dorothy Kuya
 Trevor Carter
 Len Johnson
 Billy Strachan
 Claudia Jones
 Charlie Hutchison

References 

1920 births
2007 deaths
British communists
British journalists
British civil rights activists
British newspaper publishers (people)
Communist Party of Great Britain members
Jamaican socialists
People from Portland Parish
Jamaican accountants
Migrants from British Jamaica to the United Kingdom